Showy beardtongue or showy penstemon is a common name for several plants and may refer to:

Penstemon cobaea, native to the south central United States, with pink to purple flowers
Penstemon speciosus, native to the western United States, with blue flowers
Penstemon spectabilis, native to California and Baja California, with purple flowers